No. 272 Squadron RAF was a Royal Air Force Squadron formed as an anti–submarine unit in World War I and a coastal fighter unit in World War II.

History

Formation and World War I
No. 272 Squadron Royal Flying Corps was formed on 25 July 1918 and operated DH.6s from Machrihanish, Scotland on anti-submarine patrols and disbanded on 5 March 1919.

Reformation in World War II
The squadron reformed on 19 November 1940 at RAF Aldergrove. It received Blenheims and then converted to Beaufighters. Commanded from 1941 to 1942 by Wing Commander Robert Yaxley, it operated in the Western Desert, attacking enemy aerodromes, transport aircraft and lines of communication. There were a number of Belgian aircrew in the squadron. 

It was then based in Crete to provide protection for convoys and at Luqa, Malta and Sicily following Operation Husky. On 8 September 1944, the Italian liner  was attacked by twelve 272 Squadron Beaufighters at Capodistria Bay, south of Trieste, leaving her on fire and badly listing. As the Allied forces advanced into Italy the squadron moved to Alghero and Foggia, and it disbanded at Gragnano on 30 April 1945.

Aircraft operated

References

External links

 History of No.'s 271–275 Squadrons at RAF Web
 272 Squadron history on the official RAF website

272
Military units and formations established in 1918
1918 establishments in the United Kingdom